Uddebo is a locality situated in Tranemo Municipality, Västra Götaland County, Sweden with 258 inhabitants in 2010.

References 

The name Uddebo was given to the small community after the discover of the runestone "Tree-Udden", which was placed on a Viking graveyard sometime in the years from 500-1000 CE.

External links 
Detailed map of Uddebo and near places maplandia.com

Populated places in Västra Götaland County
Populated places in Tranemo Municipality